Crowdy Head Light  is an active lighthouse located at Crowdy Head, a headland between Forster and Port Macquarie, New South Wales, Australia. It is registered with the Register of the National Estate.

History 
The first station in the area was a pilot station established in 1860 at nearby Harrington, assisting ships navigating the entrance of the Manning River.

The current lighthouse is the last of five lighthouses of similar design designed and built by James Barnet in 1878–80, the other four being Fingal Head Light, Clarence River Light (now demolished), Tacking Point Lighthouse and Richmond River Light. The original light was a fixed white light from a 4th order catadioptric apparatus with an intensity of less than 1,000 cd. It was manned by one keeper.

In 1928 the apparatus was converted to a carbide lamp (acetylene gas), with an intensity of 1,500 cd. At the same opportunity, the light was automated.

The pilot station was closed in the 1960s. In 1972 the light was converted to mains electricity.

In 2002 the 4th order Fresnel lens was sold on eBay for $20,000, and is now on display at Sea Girt Light in New Jersey.

Structure 

The circular tower is capped by an oversailing bluestone platform supported by shaped bluestone corbels. It can be reached by a metal stair from the concrete slab which forms the ground floor and foundation for the buildings.

A porch, roofed just above door height, connects the tower to a rectangular annexe, which originally contained a duty room for the keeper and a store for fuel

All the external walls of the structure are cement rendered and painted white. The platform is surmounted by a simple metal domed lantern which encloses the optical apparatus. A handrail at the platform perimeter is of white painted cast iron standards with wrought iron rails.

Site operation 
The light is managed by Transport for NSW, while the site is managed by the New South Wales Department of Lands.

Visiting 
The grounds of the lighthouse are open, but the tower is closed.

See also 

 List of lighthouses in Australia

Notes

References 

 
  Listed as "Crookhaven Head".

External links 

Lighthouses completed in 1878
Lighthouses in New South Wales
1878 establishments in Australia